Depth Charge (1941–1965) was a Thoroughbred son of Bold Venture who went on to become an outstanding sire of American Quarter Horse racehorses. He was posthumously inducted into the AQHA Hall of Fame

Background

Depth Charge was a registered Thoroughbred son of Bold Venture. His dam was a mare named Quickly, a descendant of The Tetrarch and the imported to the United States stallion Rock Sand. Depth Charge was bred by John D. Hertz. Quickly was also the dam of Count Fleet, a U. S. Triple Crown winner. Depth Charge was a year younger than his famous half brother.

Racing career
Depth Charge raced on the Thoroughbred tracks, piling up a record of five wins, three seconds and two thirds from sixteen starts. His total earnings were $5,943.00, including a third place finish in the Myles Standish Stakes.

Stud career
During his breeding career, Depth Charge sired 174 Thoroughbred foals, with 149 starters and 121 winners. He also sired 220 Quarter Horse foals, with 80 of them earning their AQHA Race Register of Merits. Among his offspring were the Quarter Horse racehorses Johnny Dial, Super Charge, Tiny Charger, Dividend, and Miss Queenie. He also sired Thoroughbred stakes winners including Dark Charger, Free Stride, Queen Margie and Baloma. His highest race earning Quarter Horse foal was Three Deep, who earned $35,258.00.

Death and honors
Depth Charge died in 1965, at Shamrock, Texas.  He was inducted into the AQHA Hall of Fame in 1991.

Pedigree

Notes

References

 All Breed Pedigree Database Pedigree of Depth Charge retrieved on June 22, 2007

External links
 Depth Charge at Quarter Horse Directory
 Depth Charge at Quarter Horse Legends

Racehorses bred in the United States
Racehorses trained in the United States
American Quarter Horse sires
1941 racehorse births
1965 racehorse deaths
Thoroughbred family 6-a
AQHA Hall of Fame (horses)